Numida was an ancient Roman town in the Roman province of Mauretania Caesariensis. It was located in modern northern Algeria.

The town was also the seat of an ancient Christian diocese of the Roman Catholic Church, of which very little is known. That Diocese survives today as a titular bishopric.

The location of the classical antiquity has been lost since the Muslim conquest of the Maghreb, and all that remains is the titular bishopric of the Roman Catholic Church that was once centered in that town.

Bishopric
Today Numida survives as a titular bishopric and the current archbishop, personal title, is Giovanni Battista.

Known bishops of the diocese include 
 At the 411 Carthage conference between the Catholic and Donatist bishops of Roman North Africa,  the town was represented by the Donatist bishop Gennaro, without a Catholic opponent.  
 Vittore participated in the synod assembled in Carthage by the Arian King Huneric the Vandal, after which Vittore was exiled. 

 Morandini, an apostolic nuncio. 
 Ildefonso Naselli  fl. 20 September 1728   
 Severino Maria Castelli fl. 27. März 1765   
 Etienne Blanquet de Rouville of Reims 1828–1838  
 Paul Bui Chu Tao of Phát Diem 1959–1960  
 Cornélio Veerman Cametá 1961–1970  
 Edward Louis Heston 1972–1973  
 Mario Pio Gaspari 1973–1983  
 Giovanni Battista Morandini 1983–current

See also
Numida helmeted guineafowl
Mauretania Caesariensis

References

Roman towns and cities in Mauretania Caesariensis 
Catholic titular sees in Africa
Former Roman Catholic dioceses in Africa
Numidia
Roman towns and cities in Algeria